One of France's Secretaries of State under the Ancien Régime was entrusted with control of the French Navy (Secretary of State of the Navy (France).) In 1791, this title was changed to Minister of the Navy. Before January 1893, this position also had responsibility for France's colonies, and was usually known as Minister of the Navy and Colonies, a role thereafter taken by the Minister of the Overseas. In 1947 the naval ministry was absorbed into the Ministry of Defence, with the exception of merchant marine affairs which had been split in 1929 to the separate Ministry of Merchant Marine.

History 
The two French royal fleets (the Ponant fleet and Levant fleet) were put under the control of Colbert from 1662, whilst he was "intendant des finances" and "minister of state" – but not "secretary of state" : he only became secretary of state in 1669 after having bought his way into the post. From then on, right up to the French Revolution, a secretary of state had responsibility for the fleet.

The secretary of state was responsible for the administration of both the navy (the "marine royale") and civilian (merchant marine) fleets, and for all France's ports, arsenals, consulates, and colonies, as well as the guardianship for all her commercial companies.

To his two original offices (the bureau du Ponant and bureau du Levant) other services were added over time:

archives department, 1669; 
office of the Ponant consulates, 1709; 
office of the colonies, 1710; 
bureau des classes, 1711; 
department of maps and plans, 1720; 
Office of the Levant Consulates, 1738, which was in 1743 merged with the Office of the Ponant Consulates under the name of Office of Commerce and Consulates

These different offices and departments were regrouped into four super-departments by marshal de Castries in 1786.

List of officeholders

Secretaries of State for the Navy, 1547–1790

Ministers of the Navy and the Colonies, 1790–1893

Naval Ministers, 1893–1947

See also
 Minister of the Armies (France)
 Minister of Air (France)
 Minister of the Colonies (France)
 Minister of the Overseas (France)
 Minister of Merchant Marine (France)

References

Naval Minister
 
Ministers, France